The 'National Alliance' is a political alliance in Sint Maarten, formed by the Sint Maarten Patriotic Alliance and the National Progressive Party. It is one of main political parties within Sint Maarten.
At the legislative elections in the Netherlands Antilles, 18 January 2002, the alliance won 4.8% of the popular vote of Sint Maarten and 1 out of 22 seats.  At the elections in the Netherlands Antilles of 27 January 2006, it won one extra seat.

After Sint Maarten became a country within the Kingdom of the Netherlands in 2010, NA was part of the coalition of the Second Wescott-Williams Cabinet (2012-2013) and the party leader William Marlin was Prime Minister in two cabinets between 2015 and 2017 (First and Second Marlin Cabinet. After the island was hit by Hurricane Irma in September 2017, Marlin and several of his ministers received a motion of no confidence in the Sint Maarten parliament due to his role in the negotiations with the Netherlands for aid funds and the anti fraud measures. While Marlin offered his resignation after the first motion of no confidence, he did not step down after the second, and the Council of Ministers of the Kingdom eventually instructed governor Eugene Holiday to immediately accept the resignation of the prime minister and replace him. The coalition remains the same, and new elections were ordered.

On 3 January 2018 Silveria Jacobs was elected as the new party leader with Rodolphe Samuel as its deputy.

References

See also
 List of political parties in Sint Maarten
 Sint Maarten Patriotic Alliance
 National Progressive Party
 Multi-Party System
 Sint Maartin

Political parties in Sint Maarten
Political party alliances in the Netherlands